David Hurwitz (born 29 August 1961) is an American music critic and author who specializes in classical music. Based in New York, he is the founder and executive editor of ClassicsToday.com and frequently reviews recordings there. Hurwitz has published numerous books, primarily guides on specific composers for the Amadeus Press "Unlocking the Masters" series, namely, Mahler, Mozart, Dvořák, Haydn, Shostakovich, Sibelius, Bernstein, Strauss, C. P. E. Bach and Handel. Other publications include an introduction to classical music, two articles on the 19th-century use of vibrato as well as surveys on the symphonies of Beethoven (the 5th and 7th) and Brahms (all four). He was the chairman for the Cannes Classical Awards while it existed from 1994 to 2010.

Life and career
David Hurwitz was born on 29 August 1961, in Wilmington, Delaware, United States. Raised in Connecticut, Hurwitz attended Johns Hopkins University and Stanford University, receiving graduate degrees in Modern European History from both. He has, at various times, studied piano, clarinet, viola, and percussion. With latter in particular, he was an orchestral percussionist, with performing credits that include "all of [Mahler's] symphonies except for the Eighth". He now lives in Brooklyn, New York.

Hurwitz is the founder and executive editor of ClassicsToday.com, a daily review site for classical music recordings. In addition to a written review, the site gives each recording two rankings from 1–10 in "Artistic Quality" and "Sound Quality; a 1 is defined as "unacceptable, no redeeming qualities", while a 10 represents "superior, qualities of unusual merit". Apart from frequent contributions on ClassicsToday.com, Hurwitz has published articles in CD Review, Classical Pulse!, High Fidelity, In Tune Monthly, Musical America, Opus, Stereo Review, The New York Observer, among other magazines. He was the chairman and founder of the Cannes Classical Awards (CCA), awarded at the Marché International du Disque et de l'Edition Musicale by a multinational jury of critics from around the world. The CCA existed from 1994 to 2010, until it was replaced by the Midem Classical Awards and presently, the International Classical Music Awards; Hurwitz left after 2010.

His publications include several books designed to acquaint the casual listener with classical music, the earliest being the 1992 Beethoven or Bust: A Practical Guide to Understanding and Listening to Great Music. Later books include various volumes for the "Unlocking the Masters" series of the Amadeus Press (part of Rowman & Littlefield). These contributions were Volume 2, on Mahler's symphonies; Volume 3 on Mozart's instrumental works; Volume 4 on Mozart's vocal works; Volume 5 on Dvořák's music; Volume 6 on Haydn's music; Volume 9 on Shostakovich's symphonies and concertos; Volume 12 on the orchestral works of Sibelius; Volume 22 on Leonard Bernstein's orchestral music; Volume 25 on the music of Richard Strauss; Volume 28 on the music of Carl Philipp Emanuel Bach; and a volume on the music of George Frideric Handel. Other books include studies of Beethoven's Fifth and Seventh Symphonies, and the Brahms symphonies.

In 2020 Hurwitz launched a YouTube channel on which he regularly posts video reviews and discographical surveys.

Musicological scholarship
Hurwitz has published two articles on the subject of vibrato in 19th-century musical performance. His study "'So Klingt Wien': Conductors, Orchestras, and Vibrato in the 19th and Early 20th Century", was published in the journal Music and Letters in February 2012. In it, Hurwitz marshals evidence from period treatises and other sources to oppose the arguments of musicologist Clive Brown, conductor Sir Roger Norrington, and others that orchestral string players applied vibrato only as an ornament, not as a basic sound. He furthers that the basic orchestral string tone was "straight" or vibrato-free—during the period in question; Hurwitz argues that continuous vibrato was, instead, already typical.

In a 2014 study, "Vibrato, the Orchestral Organ and the ‘Prevailing Aesthetic’ in Nineteenth-Century Symphonic Music," published in the Cambridge University Press journal Nineteenth-Century Music Review, Hurwitz surveyed extensive evidence on the design of organs in the nineteenth century. His sources included correspondence, published articles, transcriptions, and actual organs surviving intact from the era. He argues that they demonstrate that in seeking to capture the sound of string sections as faithfully as possible, organ builders of the nineteenth century were unanimous and quite explicit in reporting that string sections played with continuous vibrato.

Publications

Books

 
 
 
 
 
 
 
 
 
 
 
 
 
 

Articles

References

Notes

Citations

External links
 Articles by David Hurwitz on the Classics Today website
 Articles by David Hurwitz on the Reference Recordings website

Living people
American music critics
Writers from Wilmington, Delaware
Johns Hopkins University alumni
Stanford University alumni
1961 births
Classical music critics